René Dedič (born 7 August 1993) is a Slovak professional footballer who currently plays for Slovak club MFK Tatran Liptovský Mikuláš on loan from Třinec as a forward.

References

External links
 SFC Opava official club profile 
 
 Futbalnet profile 
 

1993 births
Living people
Slovak footballers
Association football forwards
SFC Opava players
Czech First League players
Czech National Football League players
FK Fotbal Třinec players
Slovak expatriate sportspeople in the Czech Republic
Slovak expatriate footballers
FC ŠTK 1914 Šamorín players
1. FK Příbram players
FC Viktoria Plzeň players
MFK Tatran Liptovský Mikuláš players
Expatriate footballers in the Czech Republic